Bank of California Building may refer to:

 Bank of California Building (Portland, Oregon)
 Bank of California Building (San Francisco), California
 Bank of California Building (Seattle), Washington

See also
Union Bank Tower (Portland, Oregon), formerly called the Bank of California Building